The pink star moth (Derrima stellata) is a species of moth of the family Noctuidae. It is found from southern Maine to Florida, west to Missouri and Texas.

The wingspan is 21–30 mm. Adults are on wing from April to May and from July to August. There are two generations per year. It is listed as a species of special concern in Connecticut.

References

External links
Moth Photographers Group Images
Butterflies and Moths of North America

Heliothinae